Doña Leonor Cortés Moctezuma (born c. 1528 – died before 1594) was the out-of-wedlock daughter of Hernán Cortés, conquistador of Mexico, and Doña Isabel Moctezuma, the eldest daughter of the Aztec Emperor Moctezuma II. She was acknowledged by her father and married Juan de Tolosa, one of the discoverers of the silver mines in Zacatecas.

Background
Doña Isabel Moctezuma was married and widowed four times by the time she was 17 or 18 years old.  With the death of her fourth husband in 1527, Cortés, the ruler of New Spain moved her into his palace and, shortly, she became pregnant with her first child. The relationship between Cortés and Doña Isabel was not a happy one and he married the pregnant Doña Isabel to a subordinate, Pedro Gallego de Andrade.  Four or five months later in 1528 Doña Leonor was born.  Doña Leonor was separated from her mother and raised in the household of Juan Gutiérrez de Altamirano.  Cortés, however, acknowledged Doña Leonor as his daughter and ensured that her life would be comfortable.

Marriage and family
Doña Leonor, bearing the two most prestigious surnames in Mexico, became extremely wealthy.  Her father, Hernán Cortés, died in 1547 in Spain, leaving her 10,000 ducats and her mother Doña Isabel Moctezuma gave her part of her estate, apparently reconciled with her out-of-wedlock daughter. She accepted marriage with Juan de Tolosa, one of the discoverers of the silver mines and founders of the city of Zacatecas in 1546.  With her half brother, Luis Cortés, she traveled from Mexico City to Zacatecas in 1550 to be married.  The colonial aristocracy of Zacatecas was a close knit community of Basques intermarried with Spanish and Aztec aristocracy.

The couple had at least three children. Juan de Tolosa Cortés de Moctezuma, born in the 1550s, became a priest and Vicar of Zacatecas. Leonor de Tolosa Cortés Moctezuma, also born in the 1550s, married into another of the Basque founding families of Zacatecas.  Her husband was Cristóbal de Zaldivar Mendoza. Isabel de Tolosa Cortés Moctezuma, born about 1568, married Juan de Oñate who founded the Spanish colony of New Mexico in 1598. Other daughters, names unknown, are mentioned in the records as being in a convent in Seville in 1604.

Death
The date of Doña Leonor's death is unknown, although apparently she died, as did her husband, before 1594.

References

Bibliography 

Leonor
People from Zacatecas
History of Mexico
1520s births
Year of death unknown
16th-century Mexican people
16th-century indigenous people of the Americas
Mexican people of Aztec descent
Mexican people of Spanish descent
Nobility of the Americas